Kashi (1954 – 2016) known by his professional name Sanketh Kashi, was an Indian actor in the Kannada film industry. Some of the notable films of Kashi as an actor include Ulta Palta (1997), Nammoora Mandara Hoove (1996), Beladingalagi Baa (2008), and Mangalyam Tantunanena (1998).

Career
Kashi was  part of more than one hundred and forty films in Kannada, including television series  'Malgudi Days'.

Awards

Selected filmography

Jaggu Dada (2016)
Mr. Airavata (2015)
Dandupalya (2012)
Kanteerava (2011)
Kirathaka (2011) 
Swathi Muthu (2003)
Excuse Me (2003)
Nandhi (2003)
 Maduve Aagona Baa (2001)
Sparsha (2000)
O Premave (1999)
Sneha (1999)
Naanu Nanna Hendthiru (1999)
Mangalyam Tantunanena (1998)
 Hendithghelthini (1998)
 Nishyabda (1998)
 Ulta Palta (1997)
 Nammoora Mandara Hoove (1996)
 Sipayi (1996)
 Dore (1995)
 Aragini (1995)
 Halunda Thavaru (1994)
 Indrana Gedda Narendra (1994)
 Curfew (1994)
 Nishkarsha (1993)
 Annayya (1993)
 Mane Devru (1993)
 Makkaliralavva Mane Thumba (1984)
 Accident (1985)

See also

List of people from Karnataka
Cinema of Karnataka
List of Indian film actors
Cinema of India

References

External links

2016 deaths
Male actors in Kannada cinema
Indian male film actors
Male actors from Karnataka
20th-century Indian male actors
21st-century Indian male actors
1954 births
Place of birth missing